Rhythm & Bluegrass: Hank Wilson, Vol. 4 is an album by singer and songwriter Leon Russell and the band New Grass Revival with Russell singing under the pseudonym Hank Wilson. Produced by Russell, the album was recorded in the 1980 but was not released until October 23, 2001. This is Russell's second album with New Grass Revival, who became his backup group and opening act in 1979.

Background
Leon Russell was born in Oklahoma, had a home in Tulsa, and grew up around country and blues music. After making successful rock albums, touring, and releasing the concert album Leon Live, he returned to his roots under the name of a fictional musical personality: Hank Wilson. Leon Russell and some of his close friends from both Los Angeles and Nashville recorded the honky tonk songs between February 26 and February 28 in 1973.

Leon made a total of four Hank Wilson albums:
Hank Wilson's Back Vol. I (1973)
Hank Wilson, Vol. II  (1984)
Legend in My Time: Hank Wilson Vol. III (1998)
Rhythm & Bluegrass: Hank Wilson, Vol. 4 (2001)
In 2009 Leon released the album Best of Hank Wilson

Track listing
 "I've Just Seen a Face" (Paul McCartney, John Lennon) – 1:43
 "Footprints in the Snow" (Bill Monroe) – 2:47
 "Columbus Stockade Blues" (Jimmie Davis, Leon Russell, Traditional) – 2:51
 "I Believe My Soul" (Ray Charles) – 3:12
 "Rough and Rocky Road" (Russell, Traditional) – 3:12
 "Mystery Train" (Junior Parker, Sam Phillips) – 2:46
 "When My Blue Moon Turns to Gold Again (Wiley Walker, Gene Sullivan) – 2:06
 "In the Pines" (Huddie Ledbetter, Alan Riggs, Russell) – 2:32
 "Open Up the Door" (Russell, Traditional) – 2:09
 "Bluebirds Are Singing for Me" (Mac Wiseman, Lester Flatt) – 1:49
 "Rhythm and Bluegrass" (Russell) – 2:34
 "Pilgrim Land" (Russell) – 2:39

Personnel
 Leon Russell  – guitar, keyboards, piano, vocals 
 Courtney Johnson – banjo, backing vocals
 John Cowan with New Grass Revival – bass, backing vocals
 Sam Bush with New Grass Revival – fiddle, backing vocals, mandolin
 Curtis Burch with New Grass RevivalGuitar, Dobro, Backing Vocals: 
 Bill Kenner – mandolin
 Ambrose Campbell – percussion

References

External links
Youtube Leon Russell Goodnight Irene in Studio
Leon Russell discography
Leon Russell NAMM Oral History Program Interview (2012)

2001 albums
Leon Russell albums